Dermomurex wareni is a species of sea snail, a marine gastropod mollusk in the family Muricidae, the murex snails or rock snails.

Description
The length of the shell varies between 37 mm and 57 mm.

Distribution
This marine species occurs off New Caledonia.

References

 Merle D., Garrigues B. & Pointier J.-P. (2011) Fossil and Recent Muricidae of the world. Part Muricinae. Hackenheim: Conchbooks. 648 pp. page(s): 220

External links
 Intergovernmental Oceanographic Commission (IOC) of UNESCO. The Ocean Biogeographic Information System (OBIS)
 
 MNHN, Paris: holotpye

Dermomurex
Gastropods described in 1990